Moussa Sène (born 19 January 1946) is a Senegalese basketball player. He competed in the men's tournament at the 1968 Summer Olympics.

References

1946 births
Living people
Senegalese men's basketball players
Olympic basketball players of Senegal
Basketball players at the 1968 Summer Olympics
Basketball players from Dakar